Company scrip is scrip (a substitute for government-issued legal tender or currency) issued by a company to pay its employees. It can only be exchanged in company stores owned by the employers. In the United Kingdom, such truck systems have long been formally outlawed under the Truck Acts. In the United States, payment in scrip became illegal in 1938 as part of the Fair Labor Standards Act.

In the United States, mining and logging camps were typically created, owned and operated by a single company. These locations, some quite remote, were often cash poor; even in ones that were not, workers paid in scrip had little choice but to purchase goods at a company store, as exchange into currency, if even available, would exhaust some of the value via the exchange fee. With this economic monopoly, the employer could place large markups on goods, making workers dependent on the company, thus enforcing employee "loyalty". While scrip was not exclusive to the coal industry, an estimated 75 percent of all scrip used was by coal companies in Kentucky, Virginia, and West Virginia. Because of this, many derived nicknames for the type of currency originated in the Appalachian mining communities, such as "Flickers," "Clackers," and "Dugaloos."

Tokens were made out of a variety of metals, including brass, copper, zinc, and nickel. There were additionally "compressed fibre" coins produced during World War II in an effort to conserve metals for wartime production.

Lumber company scrip
In 19th century United States forested areas, cash was often hard to come by. This was particularly true in lumber camps, where workers were commonly paid in company-issued scrip rather than government issued currency.

In Wisconsin, for example, forest-products and lumber companies were specifically exempted from the state law requiring employers to pay workers' wages in cash. Lumber and timber companies frequently paid their workers in scrip which was redeemable at the company store. Company-run stores served as a convenience for workers and their families, but also allowed the companies to exploit workers for increased profit. In certain cases, employers included contract provisions requiring employees to patronize the company stores. Employees who wanted to change their scrip to cash generally had to do so at a discount.

Lumber company scrip was redeemable in lumber as well as other merchandise. According to the Wisconsin Historical Society, such an option may have appealed to new settlers in the region, who worked in the lumber camps in winter to earn enough money to establish a farm. Taking some of their wages in lumber may have helped them build a much-needed house or barn.

Coal company scrip

Coal scrip is "tokens or paper with a monetary value issued to workers as an advance on wages by the coal company or its designated representative". As such, coal scrip could only be used at the specific locality or coal town of the company named. Because coal scrip was used in the context of a coal town, where there were usually no other retail establishments in that specific remote location, employees who used this could only redeem their value at that specific location. As there were no other retail establishments, this constituted a monopoly. The coal town was established by out-of-state corporations and fueled by cheap labor provided by European immigrants who came to Appalachia in search of work in the growing coal industry.

The use of coal scrip dates to the late 1800s as coal companies looked for a way increase their profits (although the stated reason for using scrip was to eliminate keeping large cash reserves). Rather than receiving compensation in United States currency, many miners received payment entirely in scrip, which could be used only at a store owned by the coal company (called a company store). Coal companies would also advance miners their wages in scrip, but would pay from 50% to 80% of their wages for such advances (a form of early payday loans). The result was a situation in which miners were perpetually in debt to their employer, receiving only an "advance against unearned wages." Moreover, because the company store was often the only place to spend scrip, the company could charge exorbitant prices in these rural communities compared to prices in major cities.

There was no uniform design, but each coin generally identified the location of the coal company town and predominantly featured the words "non-transferrable" to communicate to recipients it could not be transferred for U.S. currency.

Coal scrip was deemed unconstitutional if non-transferable in the early twentieth century, but continued to exist in Kentucky and West Virginia until officially outlawed by Congress in 1967.

The country musician Merle Travis, on the album Folk Songs of the Hills, makes reference to coal scrip in the song "Sixteen Tons", made famous by Tennessee Ernie Ford.

Wartime

From 1914 to 1924, during and following the First World War, a variety of forms of German scrip were issued, including Notgeld, Lagergeld, Gutscheine and Serienscheine. Such currencies were issued "by principalities, German colonial governments, cities, large corporations, small businesses, prisoner-of-war camps, and in some cases, individuals."

Modern practice
The practice has been documented as recently as 2019. On September 4, 2008, the Mexican Supreme Court of Justice ruled that Walmart de Mexico, the Mexican subsidiary of Walmart, must cease paying its employees in part with vouchers redeemable only at Walmart stores. On May 21, 2019, The Washington Post published an article highlighting Amazon's new system of "gamification", which rewards employees who complete high numbers of orders with Swag Bucks in a game-like system, which can then be used to buy Amazon-themed merchandise.

See also
 Company town
 Truck system
 Private currency

References

External links
 
 Cawood, Steve, past president National Scrip Collectors AssociationScrip Definition

Private currencies
Historical currencies of the United States
Mining culture and traditions